Sandra Choi is a British businesswoman and fashion designer. She is the creative director of J. Choo Limited. She is the niece of Jimmy Choo's wife, Rebecca.

Background
Choi was born on the Isle of Wight and educated in Hong Kong before returning to London as a teenager to finish her secondary school education. During this time, Choi, who has been described in UK media as British Asian, went to work with her uncle, Jimmy Choo, who was then a couture shoemaker based in the East End of London. Passionate about turning her apprenticeship into a career as a designer, Choi attended the prestigious Central St Martins School where she studied for a degree in Fashion Design whilst continuing work as Choo's protégé. At his side, Choi perfecting the art of creating couture shoes: designing, cutting patterns, stitching, fitting and constructing lasts. Enchanted by the business, Choi eventually abandoned her studies so that she could devote herself full-time to design and the management of the atelier.

Career
Choi was appointed Creative Director of J. Choo Limited at its inception in 1996, working in conjunction with Tamara Mellon OBE. The company's first J. Choo Limited store was opened in 1996 on Motcomb Street in London complementing distribution in selected department stores.

With a strategy to expanding internationally, the company established a retail presence in the United States with its first store in New York City in 1998, followed by Los Angeles in 1999. Using the store's LA foothold to cater to Hollywood celebrities, Choi worked with celebrities and their stylists from a hotel atelier creating Jimmy Choo shoes for award show dressing. The red carpet proved to be the ideal runway for shoes and then handbags, as actresses including Marion Cotillard, Kate Winslet, Halle Berry, Sandra Bullock, Cate Blanchett and Natalie Portman all took their paces wearing Jimmy Choo.

Awards and recognitions 
Accolades followed with J. Choo Limited awarded 2008 'Designer Brand of the Year' from the British Fashion Council, the 2008 ‘ACE Brand of the Year' from the Accessory Council and the 2008 'Brand of the Year' from Footwear News in New York. J. Choo Limited was bought by private equity group Equinox in 2001, who began a ten-year store opening programme which continued under the ownership of Lion Capital from 2004 and TowerBrook Capital Partners LP from 2007.  In 2011, J. Choo Limited was acquired by Labelux, the fashion holdings arm of JAB Holdings, which was renamed JAB Luxury in July 2014.

Over the course of the various private equity transactions, Jimmy Choo and Tamara Mellon OBE left the company, with Sandra remaining Creative Director throughout.  As her responsibilities increased, with the addition of bags, fragrances, eyewear and the launch of the men's business, Sandra was named Sole Creative Director in 2013.

In September 2019, Choi discussed the redesigned Jimmy Choo brand logo with media. In January 2020, she collaborated with Kaia Gerber on a new combat-style boot with 15 percent of sales donated to St. Jude Children's Research Hospital.

Personal life
Choi is married to Tamburlaine Gorst, son of Conservative politician Sir John Michael Gorst.

References

External links

Shoe designers
Living people
People from the Isle of Wight
Alumni of Central Saint Martins
Year of birth missing (living people)